The Magic School Bus is a series of children's books about science, written by Joanna Cole and illustrated by Bruce Degen.  Designed for ages 6-9, they feature the antics of Ms. Valerie Felicity Frizzle and her class, who board a sentient anthropomorphic Type A school bus which takes them on field trips to impossible locations, including the solar system, clouds, the past, and the human body. The books are written in the first person from the point of view of an unnamed student in "the Friz's" class. The class has a pet lizard named Liz, who accompanies the class on their field trips.  

Since the Magic School Bus books present scientific facts in the form of stories in which fantastic things happen (for example, the bus turns into a spaceship, or children shrink to the size of blood cells), each book has a page at the end detailing in a humorous manner which parts of the book represented scientific fact and which were fanciful storytelling. Similarities to Maurice Dolbier's The Magic Bus (1948) illustrated  by Tibor Gergely are strictly coincidental.

History 
Craig Walker, vice-president and senior editorial director at Scholastic Co., stated that the concept began with the idea of combining science with fictional stories, and Joanna Cole (who had written both science and humor before) and Bruce Degen were then approached with creating such a series. Walker also states that his own memories of school field trips and of a teacher he had once, served as further inspiration.

The first book "At the Waterworks" was written in 1985 and published the following year.

Cole and Degen started a new series called Ms. Frizzle's Adventures in 2001, which teaches social studies. In those books, Ms. Frizzle travels through time via a special watch. There are now three books in that series. Microsoft Home started publishing Magic School Bus software in 1994. TW Kids published four audio cassettes/activity book "Fun-Kits" in 1994 and 1995, these audio cassettes use audio from the TV Series. Scholastic has also published the original series books as read-along book-on-tapes and book-on-CDs.

Characters 

In the original series books, Ms. Frizzle's class had a larger number of multiethnic students and consisted of Arnold, Tim, Ralph (changed to "Ralphie" on the show and later books in this series), Dorothy Ann, Wanda, Phoebe, John, Carmen, Gregory, Amanda-Jane, Florrie, Shirley, Michael, Phil, Molly, Rachel, Alex, Carlos, and Keesha (19 students). Phoebe was first introduced in the 1987 book, The Magic School Bus Inside the Earth. Carlos and Keesha were added in the 1994 book, The Magic School Bus In the Time of Dinosaurs.

List of books and merchandise

Original series books 
The Magic School Bus at the Waterworks (1986)
The Magic School Bus Inside the Earth (1987)
The Magic School Bus Inside the Human Body (1989)
The Magic School Bus Lost in the Solar System (1990)
The Magic School Bus On the Ocean Floor (1992)
The Magic School Bus In the Time of the Dinosaurs (1994)
The Magic School Bus Inside a Hurricane (1995)
The Magic School Bus Inside a Beehive (1996)
The Magic School Bus and the Electric Field Trip (1997)
The Magic School Bus Explores the Senses (1999)
The Magic School Bus and the Science Fair Expedition (2006)
The Magic School Bus and the Climate Challenge (2010)
The Magic School Bus Explores Human Evolution (2020)
Notes: *The Science Fair Expedition released 20 years after at its anniversary.

Chapter books 
 The Truth about Bats
 The Search for the Missing Bones
 The Wild Whale Watch
 Space Explorers
 Twister Trouble
 The Giant Germ
 The Great Shark Escape
 Penguin Puzzle
 Dinosaur Detectives
 Expedition Down Under
 Insect Invaders
 Amazing Magnetism
 Polar Bear Patrol
 Electric Storm
 Voyage to the Volcano
 Butterfly Battle
 Food Chain Frenzy
 The Fishy Field Trip
 Color Day Relay
 Rocky Road Trip

Scholastic Reader Level 2 
 The Magic School Bus Has A Heart
 The Magic School Bus Gets Caught In a Web
 The Magic School Bus Gets Recycled
 The Magic School Bus And the Missing Tooth
 The Magic School Bus Fights Germs
 The Magic School Bus Gets Crabby
 The Magic School Bus Explores the World of Bugs
 The Magic School Bus Weathers the Storm
 The Magic School Bus At the First Thanksgiving
 The Magic School Bus Arctic Adventure
 The Magic School Bus Lost in Snow
 The Magic School Bus and the Shark Adventure
 The Magic School Bus Builds the Statue of Liberty
 The Magic School Bus in a Bat Cave
 The Magic School Bus Comes to Its Senses
 The Magic School Bus and the Wild Leaf Ride
 The Magic School Bus and the Butterfly Bunch
 The Magic School Bus Inside a Volcano
 The Magic School Bus Rides the Wind
 The Magic School Bus in the Rain Forest
 The Magic School Bus Sleeps for the Winter
 The Magic School Bus Explores the World of Animals
 The Magic School Bus to the Rescue: Blizzard
 The Magic School Bus to the Rescue: Forest Fire
 The Magic School Bus to the Rescue: Earthquake
 The Magic School Bus to the Rescue: Flash Flood
 The Magic School Bus Inside Your Mouth
 The Magic School Bus Explores the Ocean
 The Magic School Bus Flies with Dinosaurs
 The Magic School Bus Takes a Moonwalk
 The Magic School Bus Flies From the Nest
 The Magic School Bus Blasts Into Space
 The Magic School Bus Gets Cleaned Up

TV tie-in books
 The Magic School Bus Gets Ants in its Pants
 The Magic School Bus Going Batty
 The Magic School Bus in the Haunted Museum
 The Magic School Bus Gets all Dried Up
 The Magic School Bus In the Arctic
 The Magic School Bus Meets the Rot Squad
 The Magic School Bus Blows Its Top
 The Magic School Bus Answers Questions
 The Magic School Bus Inside Ralphie
 The Magic School Bus Gets Programmed
 The Magic School Bus Kicks Up a Storm
 The Magic School Bus Plays Ball
 The Magic School Bus Plants Seeds
 The Magic School Bus Ups and Downs
 The Magic School Bus Gets a Bright Idea
 The Magic School Bus Butterfly and the Bog Beast
 The Magic School Bus Makes a Rainbow
 The Magic School Bus Gets Baked in a Cake
 The Magic School Bus Out of this World
 The Magic School Bus Taking Flight
 The Magic School Bus Takes a Dive
 The Magic School Bus Gets Cold Feet
 The Magic School Bus Shows and Tells
 The Magic School Bus Spins a Web
 The Magic School Bus Gets Planted
 The Magic School Bus Gets Eaten
 The Magic School Bus Wet All Over
 The Magic School Bus Goes Upstream
 The Magic School Bus In A Pickle
 The Magic School Bus Hops Home
 The Magic School Bus Sees Stars
 The Magic School Bus Looking for Liz (sticker book)

TV tie-in fun kits
 The Magic School Bus: Fun With Sound
 The Magic School Bus: Habitat
 The Magic School Bus: Kicks Up A Storm
 The Magic School Bus: Goes to Seed

A Science Fact Finder Book 
 Skeletons Fact Finder
 Bats Fact Finder
 Field Trip Facts

Ms. Frizzle's Adventures 
 Imperial China
 Medieval Castle
 Ancient Egypt

Liz series 
 Liz Finds a Friend
 Liz Takes Flight
 Liz Looks for a Home
 Liz Sorts It Out
 Liz on the Move
 Liz Makes a Rainbow

Magic School Bus Presents: A Nonfiction Companion to the Original Magic School Bus Series 

 Our Solar System
 The Human Body
 Sea Creatures
 The Rain Forest
 Wild Weather
 Dinosaurs
 Planet Earth
 Insects
 Volcanoes & Earthquakes
 Polar Animals

DVDs 

 AND THE ENVIRONMENT - Rocks and Rolls & Holiday Special
 AND THE FLYING ANIMALS - Going Batty & Butterfly and the Bog Beast
 BIG AND SMALL - BATMAN The Busasaurus & Gets Ants in its Pants
 EXPLORES CELLS AND MOLECULES - Meets Molly Cule & Goes Cellular
 EXPLORES INSECTS - Beehive & Spins A Web
 EXPLORES NEW HABITATS - In The City & Get Swamped
 EXPLORES THE HUMAN BODY - Works Out & Makes A Stink
 FOOD - Meets the Rot Squad & Gets Ready, Set, Dough
 FOOD CYCLE - Gets Eaten & Goes to Seed
 GETS A BOOST - Getting Energized & Revving Up
 GETS ROCKING - Out of this World & Blows its Top
 GETS TO SHINE — Gets a Bright Idea & Makes a Rainbow
 GOES ON A FIELD TRIP - In The Arctic & Goes Upstream
 HABITATS AND DESERTS - Hops Home & All Dried Up
 THE HUMAN BODY - Inside Ralphie & For Lunch
 IN MOTION - Taking Flight & Flexes Its Muscles
 IN THE AIR - Kicks Up a Storm & Gets Lost in Space
 IN THE WATER - Ups and Downs & Wet All Over
 LEARNS ABOUT MICROBES AND REPTILES - In A Pickle & Cold Feet
 LEARNS ABOUT PLANTS AND FORESTS - Gets Planted & In The Rain Forest
 LEARNS SOMETHING NEW - Cracks a Yolk & Gets Programmed
 LEARNS TO BUILD - Under Construction & Shows and Tells
 LIGHTS UP - Sees Stars & Gets Charged
 PHYSICS - Plays Ball & In the Haunted House
 TESTS THE WATERS - Goes to Mussel Beach & Takes a Dive
 UNDER PRESSURE - Goes on Air & Gains Weight
 SUPER STAR POWER - Gets Planted, Goes Cellular, Sees Stars & Taking Flight
 TAKES A DRIVE - Goes to Mussel Beach, Gets Swamped, Takes a Dive & For Lunch
 TAKES FLIGHT - Kicks Up a Storm, Taking Flight, Hops Home & Gets Swamped
 HUMAN BODY - For Lunch, Inside Ralphie, Flexes Its Muscles & Gets Planted
 BLAST OFF FROM SPACE TO SEA - Wet All Over, Ups and Downs, Rocks and Rolls, Gets Eaten, Meets the Rot Squad, Gets Ready, Set, Dough, Gets Lost in Space, Out of This World, Gains Weight, Goes Upstream, Butterfly and the Bog Beast & Plays Ball
 FIELD TRIP FUN & GAMES - The Busasaurus, Cold Feet, Goes Upstream, Plays Ball, Shows & Tells, Works Out, Gets Ants in Its Pants, Butterfly and the Bog Beast, In a Beehive, Gets Eaten, Rocks and Rolls, Gains Weight
 THE COMPLETE SERIES - All 52 episodes from the 4 season run

VHS 
 Flexes Its Muscles
 Gets Lost In Space
 Gets Charged
 All Dried Up
 Hops Home
 Inside The Haunted House
 Inside Ralphie
 Gets Eaten
 For Lunch
 Blows Its Top
 Plays Ball
 Goes To Seed
 Kicks Up A Storm
 Going Batty
 Creepy Crawly Fun
 Greatest Adventures
 Under Construction
 Out Of This World
 Gets Ants In Its Pants
 Gets Planted
 Butterflies!
 Ready, Set, Dough
 The Busasaurus
 In The Rainforest
 Makes A Rainbow
 Taking Flight
 Getting Energized
 Magic School Bus Holiday Special
 Spins A Web
 In A Beehive

Individual books
The original Magic School Bus books are:
The Magic School Bus at the Waterworks (1986)
Theme: the water cycle and the waterworks
Ms Frizzle's class is going with her on the most boring field trip, to the waterworks. At least that is what they think until they discover how interesting things always happen on Ms Frizzle's trips. After going through a tunnel, all the children find themselves in scuba diving outfits. On the top of a bridge the bus rises up in the air and into a cloud. Once in the cloud, the class finds that water droplets are growing, and they are shrinking. The class rains and lands in the water purification system. Eventually it takes them back to Walkerville Elementary, where they come out of the faucet in the girls' bathroom. Later, they see the bus outside and wonder how it returned from the cloud.
The Magic School Bus Inside the Earth (1987)
Theme: geology
Ms Frizzle's class is starting a unit on geology and for homework every student has to find a rock, and bring it to school. The next day every child except Phil has an excuse, so Ms Frizzle decides to take the class on a field trip to collect rocks. The class starts digging until they, with the help of the magic bus, dig all the way through the center of Earth. They collect many rocks and learn about the different types. Phoebe Terese first appears in this book as the "new kid". Before the show was even in production, the Magic School Bus appeared on PBS, because this book was featured on Reading Rainbow.
The Magic School Bus Inside the Human Body (1989)
Theme: the human body
Ms Frizzle's class is going to the museum to see an exhibit on the human body. However they stop for lunch at a park and Arnold takes too long to eat. When Ms Frizzle tries to hit the horn to tell him to hurry, she "accidentally" pushes a strange little button on the dashboard and the class finds itself inside a human body, but they are unaware that it is Arnold's. They go through the digestive system and brain and out through the nose.
The Magic School Bus Lost in the Solar System (1990)
Theme: the Solar System
Arnold's know-it-all cousin Janet, is coming on the field trip this time. They are going to the planetarium to see a show about the Solar System, but it is closed for repairs. On the way back to school, they blast off and fly into outer space. They visit all the planets and learn about them, but in the asteroid belt, they lose Ms Frizzle and find themselves lost in space. The rocket bus featured in this book has become a symbol of the Magic School Bus series.
The Magic School Bus On the Ocean Floor (1992)
Theme: the ocean
Ms Frizzle's class is learning about the ocean. It is really hot and the children just want a break. They are thrilled when she says they will take a trip to the ocean. When she gets to the beach she starts to drive into the water and they realise that when Ms Frizzle says "ocean" she means "ocean". Believing the bus is in trouble, Lenny the Lifeguard decides to try to save the children and instead finds himself accompanying them on the field trip.
The Magic School Bus In the Time of the Dinosaurs (1994)
Theme: dinosaurs
The children are turning their classroom into Dinosaur Land for Parents' Night, as they are studying dinosaurs. Ms. Frizzle receives a letter from an old high school friend who is now a paleontologist and she decides to take the class on a trip to the dig. When she discovers that they are missing the bones of some Maiasaurs, she turns the bus into a time machine to travel back to the age of dinosaurs to find the bones. The class sees dinosaurs and learns the name of the different periods of the era and other information. This is the first time Ms Frizzle's first name is mentioned, and it is the first appearance of Carlos Ramon and Keesha Franklin, although Keesha was first seen in The Magic School Bus: On the Ocean Floor.
The Magic School Bus Inside a Hurricane (1995)
Theme: weather
The class is going to the weather station to learn about weather. However, on the way there the bus turns into a hot air balloon. Eventually they find themselves inside a hurricane. Ms Frizzle's radio proves an annoyance to Arnold in this book, as it seems to know his name.
The Magic School Bus Inside a Beehive (1996)
Theme: bees
The class is now learning about insects and Ms Frizzle is taking her class on a trip to meet a beekeeper, but they beat the beekeeper there. While they are waiting, Ms Frizzle accidentally pushes a small lever which turns the bus into a tiny beehive and the class (including Ms Frizzle) into bees. They explore the hive and learn about bees, but can they save the hive from a bear?
The Magic School Bus and the Electric Field Trip (1998)
Theme: electricity
 The children in Ms Frizzle's class were sure that there was nobody like her, but that was before they met her niece, Dottie Frizzle. Dottie accompanies the class on their field trip to the town power plant. There the bus turns into a dump truck, and pours the children into the plant. They shrink and travel through the Walkerville electric system.
The Magic School Bus Explores the Senses (1999)
Theme: the five senses
The class is learning about the senses and they are going to sing a song for an important teacher meeting. However, Ms Frizzle's personality and clothes make the class forget. Ms Frizzle thinks the meeting is tomorrow, but it is really today. So Mr. Wilde, the assistant principal, decides to catch her so he can tell her about the meeting. He decides to get in a bus that just happens to be the magic school bus. The class decides to accompany him. They cannot let him drive that bus, not all by himself. Mr. Wilde accidentally shrinks the bus and soon he and the class find themselves on a trip exploring the senses. Mr. Wilde soon becomes obsessed with driving the bus and forgets all about finding Ms Frizzle, but the class does not. Ms Frizzle's mother appears in this book.
The Magic School Bus and the Science Fair Expedition (2006)
Theme: famous scientists in history
The first MSB book since 1999, The Magic School Bus celebrated its 20th anniversary with this new book published on 1 August 2006. Ms. Frizzle and her class have to find projects to display at the Walkerville Science Fair, and fast. They decide to consult with famous scientists in history like Louis Pasteur, George Washington Carver, Charles Darwin, Marie Curie, Isaac Newton, Galileo Galilei, even Albert Einstein. All the original characters are in this book.
The Magic School Bus and the Climate Challenge (2010)
Theme: climate change
Ms. Frizzle takes the class on a flight on the bus over the arctic, showing them how the polar ice caps have melted since Ms. Frizzle's old copy of Our Wonderful World was published. They travel around the earth, observing the impacts of global warming and alternative energy sources. Returning to their home town, Ms. Frizzle gives the class special goggles to observe the greenhouse-gas molecules in the air. When the students return to school, they discuss things people can do to save energy and reduce carbon emissions.

References

External links 

 Official site 
 

Book series introduced in 1986
Scholastic franchises
The Magic School Bus
Buses in fiction
Early childhood education materials
Series of children's books
Fiction about size change
Fiction about the Solar System

es:The Magic School Bus (serie animada)
fr:Le Bus magique
it:Allacciate le cinture viaggiando s'impara
he:אוטובוס הקסמים
nl:The Magic Schoolbus
ja:マジック・スクール・バス
fi:Taika koulubussi
sv:The Magic School Bus